Kane Graham Cornes (born 5 January 1983) is a former Australian rules footballer who played for the Port Adelaide Football Club in the Australian Football League (AFL).

Early life

A product of Sacred Heart College and Glenelg in the SANFL, he made his AFL debut in 2001 after being selected with pick 20 in the 2000 AFL Draft. Before his professional football career he attended Sacred Heart College, which is one of the most prolific schools in Australia in terms of producing Australian footballers. His All Australian brother, Chad Cornes, also attended Sacred Heart College and played for Glenelg in the SANFL. They are the sons of South Australian football identity Graham Cornes, and stepsons of 2007 Federal Labor candidate Nicole Cornes. They have three younger half-sisters paternally.

AFL career
In 2001 and 2002, Cornes played in Port Adelaide's two pre-season competition winning teams.

Then in 2004, the team made the step up, and Cornes was in the team that won the 2004 AFL premiership, Port Adelaide's first in the AFL. 2004, Cornes' fourth season in the competition, saw him cement his position in the midfield, averaging 20 disposals a game.

Cornes continued his good form into 2005 becoming All Australian, and in 2006 played his 100th game for the club in round 7, and topped the AFL Dreamteam competition, despite his team Port Adelaide having a bad year.

In 2007, Cornes won All Australian selection for the second time in a team otherwise dominated by Geelong players. He was also the leading possession winner in the AFL, received the most Brownlow votes for the year for Port Adelaide, and won their best and fairest, the John Cahill Medal, ahead of brother Chad.

In 2010, Cornes took out his third John Cahill Medal and confirmed his reputation as the club's most consistent player through a new attacking role that went beyond his previous role of merely tagging the opposition's best players. His 36-possession, 2-goal game against the Western Bulldogs in Round 16 of that year was a highlight, in addition to a 38-possession effort against West Coast late in the year. Instrumental in the Power's late season fortunes, his third best and fairest highlighted his durability as a mainstay of the Port Adelaide engine room.

In 2011, Cornes had a difficult season by his standards as he adjusted to a new role which took him further away from his traditional tagging duties. Before 2011, Cornes had not missed a single game since 2003. But round 4, 2011 saw his streak of 174 consecutive games come to an end when he was omitted from the side. Playing more on the wing and across halfback, he was sent back to Glenelg in the SANFL with a view to adapting better to the coaching panel's new expectations. He still managed to play 17 games out of a possible 23, despite spending time back at the SANFL Tigers, and was serviceable in his ball-winning ability.

Cornes made an impressive return to form in 2012, playing every game, and playing an exceptional season as a setup midfielder. He won his fourth John Cahill medal. He once again topped the disposals count for the season. Cornes received high praise for returning to his acclaimed tagging football with top performances on midfield heavyweights Brent Harvey (North Melbourne) and Gary Ablett (Gold Coast).

Cornes reached his 250th game in Round 5 of 2013, where Port Adelaide came from 41-points down to win 12.12 (84) to 10.19 (79) at AAMI Stadium against the West Coast Eagles, taking the Power to a 5–0 start to the season. Shortly after, Cornes passed Warren Tredrea's record of 258 games to become the man who has played the most games for Port Adelaide in the AFL, in a match where Port thrashed Greater Western Sydney at Skoda Stadium, 19.11 (125) to 6.14 (50). Cornes has played a vital role under Ken Hinkley in reinventing Port Adelaide and getting the team back into finals in 2013, and helping the Power to their best ever start to an AFL season in 2014, starting 10–1, before eventually losing the 2014 preliminary final to Hawthorn, the eventual premiers, by three points.

Cornes' 2015 season was short. He played the first two games of the season before being rested in round three. He then played a further three games to take his career tally to 298 before announcing that the round 8 game against Richmond would be his 300th and last to join the South Australian Metropolitan Fire Service. He finished his Port Adelaide career having played a total of 300 games, winning 4 best and fairest, two All Australian guernseys and a premiership.

Media career 
Cornes took up a full-time media career in 2016 after a short tenure with the South Australia Metropolitan Fire Service, where he had been trying to do both, with appearances on The Sunday Footy Show and 1116 SEN, as well as writing for The Advertiser. He has been known for some provocative commentary on leading AFL figures such as Patrick Dangerfield and Hawthorn Hawks in a challenging manner.  He is particularly known for his critical views including an on-going battle of words with Adelaide Crows player Taylor Walker.

Personal life
On 31 December 2004, Kane married long-time girlfriend, who he met at Sacred Heart College, Lucy. They have three children together, Eddy Jack, Raphael William and Sonny.

Cornes was a member of the South Australian Metropolitan Fire Service, while also trying to balance working in the media before leaving to take up a solely media based position. He has also provided part-time coaching work at the Glenelg Football Club.

Cornes is an accomplished distance runner having finished in the top 30 of the Melbourne Marathon and Gold Coast Marathon.

Playing statistics

|-
|- style="background-color: #EAEAEA"
! scope="row" style="text-align:center" | 2001
|
| 39 || 7 || 1 || 4 || 47 || 34 || 81 || 20 || 8 || 0.1 || 0.6 || 6.7 || 4.9 || 11.6 || 2.9 || 1.1
|-
! scope="row" style="text-align:center" | 2002
|
| 18 || 15 || 3 || 4 || 136 || 54 || 190 || 40 || 39 || 0.2 || 0.3 || 9.1 || 3.6 || 12.7 || 2.7 || 2.6
|- style="background-color: #EAEAEA"
! scope="row" style="text-align:center" | 2003
|
| 18 || 22 || 12 || 10 || 195 || 86 || 281 || 88 || 51 || 0.5 || 0.5 || 8.9 || 3.9 || 12.8 || 4.0 || 2.3
|-
! scope="row" style="text-align:center" | 2004
|
| 18 || 25 || 12 || 10 || 302 || 197 || 499 || 131 || 57 || 0.5 || 0.4 || 12.1 || 7.9 || 20.0 || 5.2 || 2.3
|- style="background-color: #EAEAEA"
! scope="row" style="text-align:center" | 2005
|
| 18 || 24 || 18 || 10 || 338 || 252 || 590 || 135 || 58 || 0.8 || 0.4 || 14.1 || 10.5 || 24.6 || 5.6 || 2.4
|-
! scope="row" style="text-align:center" | 2006
|
| 18 || 22 || 7 || 11 || 344 || 253 || 597 || 145 || 73 || 0.3 || 0.5 || 15.6 || 11.5 || 27.1 || 6.6 || 3.3
|- style="background-color: #EAEAEA"
! scope="row" style="text-align:center" | 2007
|
| 18 || 25 || 11 || 9 || 360 || 336 || 696 || 170 || 94 || 0.4 || 0.4 || 14.4 || 13.4 || 27.8 || 6.8 || 3.8
|-
! scope="row" style="text-align:center" | 2008
|
| 18 || 22 || 5 || 4 || 268 || 345 || 613 || 128 || 79 || 0.2 || 0.2 || 12.2 || 15.7 || 27.9 || 5.8 || 3.6
|- style="background-color: #EAEAEA"
! scope="row" style="text-align:center" | 2009
|
| 18 || 22 || 7 || 4 || 286 || 310 || 596 || 106 || 76 || 0.3 || 0.2 || 13.0 || 14.1 || 27.1 || 4.8 || 3.5
|-
! scope="row" style="text-align:center" | 2010
|
| 18 || 22 || 4 || 4 || 271 || 335 || 606 || 103 || 103 || 0.2 || 0.2 || 12.3 || 15.2 || 27.5 || 4.7 || 4.7
|- style="background-color: #EAEAEA"
! scope="row" style="text-align:center" | 2011
|
| 18 || 17 || 1 || 1 || 180 || 194 || 374 || 70 || 58 || 0.1 || 0.1 || 10.6 || 11.4 || 22.0 || 4.1 || 3.4
|-
! scope="row" style="text-align:center" | 2012
|
| 18 || 22 || 5 || 6 || 282 || 278 || 560 || 124 || 64 || 0.2 || 0.3 || 12.8 || 12.6 || 25.5 || 5.6 || 2.9
|- style="background-color: #EAEAEA"
! scope="row" style="text-align:center" | 2013
|
| 18 || 23 || 5 || 4 || 341 || 289 || 630 || 127 || 107 || 0.2 || 0.2 || 14.8 || 12.6 || 27.4 || 5.5 || 4.7
|-
! scope="row" style="text-align:center" | 2014
|
| 18 || 25 || 1 || 5 || 328 || 279 || 607 || 132 || 111 || 0.0 || 0.2 || 13.1 || 11.2 || 24.3 || 5.3 || 4.4
|- style="background-color: #EAEAEA"
! scope="row" style="text-align:center" | 2015
|
| 18 || 7 || 1 || 0 || 74 || 66 || 140 || 37 || 25 || 0.1 || 0.0 || 10.6 || 9.4 || 20.0 || 5.3 || 3.6
|- class="sortbottom"
! colspan=3| Career
! 300
! 93
! 86
! 3752
! 3308
! 7060
! 1556
! 1003
! 0.3
! 0.3
! 12.5
! 11.0
! 23.5
! 5.2
! 3.3
|}

References

External links

1983 births
Living people
All-Australians (AFL)
Port Adelaide Football Club players
Port Adelaide Football Club Premiership players
Port Adelaide Football Club players (all competitions)
John Cahill Medal winners
Glenelg Football Club players
Australian rules footballers from Adelaide
Kane
Brighton Districts and Old Scholars Football Club players
People educated at Sacred Heart College, Adelaide
One-time VFL/AFL Premiership players